Bucculatrix cordiaella is a moth in the family Bucculatricidae. It is found on Galapagos Islands (Floreana, Genovesa, Isabela, Santa Cruz, Santiago and Seymour Norte). It was described in 2002 by Donald R. Davis and Bernard Landry.

The length of the forewings is 1.83-2.17 mm. The forewings are white with a pattern of brown and 
brown-tipped scales. The hindwings are pale greyish brown. Adults have been recorded on wing in January, March and April.

The larvae feed on Cordia lutea. They mine the leaves of their host plant. Mines have the form of a serpentine mine.

Etymology
The species name refers to Cordia, the generic name of the host plant.

References

Bucculatricidae
Moths described in 2002